WHDT (channel 9) is an independent television station licensed to Stuart, Florida, United States, serving the West Palm Beach area. It is owned by the E. W. Scripps Company alongside NBC affiliate WPTV-TV (channel 5); Scripps also provides certain services to Fox affiliate WFLX (channel 29) under a shared services agreement (SSA) with Gray Television. The stations share studios on South Australian Avenue in downtown West Palm Beach (mailing address says Banyan Boulevard, also known as 1st Street), while WHDT's transmitter is located near Wellington west of US 441/SR 7.

History
The station was founded on May 25, 2000; WHDT became the first digital television station in the United States, following a ruling by the Federal Communications Commission (FCC) that the station could provide primary over-the-air service using only a digital signal. On June 1, 2001, the station conducted the first over-the-air broadcast using a progressive high definition format operating at 720p/60 fps, with custom-designed 35 mm frame-transfer cameras.

WHDT established the legal precedent requiring local cable systems to carry the primary programming of all digital television stations in both high definition format and in standard definition analog format. It is the first television station to have its high definition and standard definition feeds carried on cable providers under the FCC's digital "must-carry" rules. The station originally operated as the first broadcast partner of the Deutsche Welle World Television Service. WHDT was one of three stations operated by WHDT World Television Service (DE), a business unit of Marksteiner AG.

The station's two translators, WHDT-CD in Miami (now WLPH-CD) and WHDT-LD in Boston are notable as those stations were the first and second digital translators to be authorized by the FCC. WHDT-CD has a longer history than its full-power cousin. The station was first licensed as W25AL on September 21, 1987. In 1989, it was moved to Coral Springs as W55BO, which functioned as a translator of Miami CBS owned-and-operated station WCIX (channel 6, now WFOR-TV on channel 4). Ownership of the station was transferred to Günter Marksteiner in 1996. The station continued to carry a full schedule of CBS programming until 1997, when it was relocated to North Miami and began digital translator operations for WHDT in December 2001. In January 2014, the call sign was changed to WLPH-CD, and in March, the station was sold to LocusPoint Networks.

In August 2010, WHDT became the first high-definition affiliate of the Retro Television Network. The network's classic television programming was aired up-converted to 16:9 HD format as opposed to being remastered from the original film masters. On October 27, 2011, WHDT announced that it would disaffiliate from RTV and begin carrying programming from WeatherNation TV; it switched to WeatherNation on the weekend of October 29.

On June 15, 2012, WHDT launched The Auto Channel (TACH-TV), a full high-definition broadcast service dedicated to automobile enthusiasts.

From July 13 to December 31, 2015, WHDT carried SonLife Broadcasting Network (SBN), the Christian television network of Jimmy Swaggart Ministries.

On April 1, 2016, the station affiliated with Gun TV upon that network's launch the same day. Gun TV ceased operations in January 2017 and was subsequently dropped by the station.

On January 15, 2017, the station added the educational series TED Talks to its nightly lineup.

On December 3, 2018, it was announced that WHDT would be sold to the E. W. Scripps Company for $25 million. The sale was completed on April 4, 2019.

Programming
Prior to 2019, WHDT produced high definition program content for syndication and for broadcast. Its programming included evening news and weather, documentaries, independent films, classical music concerts, equestrian sports, automotive news and motorsport programs, aviation, fishing, cooking, travel and syndicated entertainment shows. The station maintains a full high definition schedule, including paid programming.

On July 6, 2021, WHDT switched programming over from Court TV to a news-formatted independent station under Scripps' newly-launched statewide streaming news service known as the Florida 24 Network which includes syndicated programs (as of 2023) AgDay, Business First A.M., The Kelly Clarkson Show and The List (the latter two also air in different timeslots on WPTV) as well as rebroadcasts of sister station WPTV's weekday 11 a.m. and weekend morning/evening newscasts. Court TV was later relocated to subchannel 9.2.

News operation
WHDT previously broadcast ten hours of locally produced news each week, exclusive of rebroadcast of news highlights on weekends. The station's WHDT World News aired each day at 5 and 11 p.m.; the weekend edition was a compilation of notable segments from the weekday broadcasts. The newscasts were produced by WHDT World Television Service, with offices in West Palm Beach, Miami, Boston, Chicago, Sacramento, Los Angeles and Washington, D.C. The hub newscasts originated from Boston and Chicago and featured local and national stories as well as extended interview segments, a brief weather segment from the National Weather Service with a forecast for the West Palm Beach area, an entertainment segment ("Hollywood News"), and political, financial and science reports from contributing editors.

Technical information

Subchannels

As part of the digital television transition, UHF channels 52-69 were removed from the broadcast spectrum. Consequently, WHDT moved its digital signal from channel 59 to channel 42 after WXEL-TV shut off its analog signal on channel 42 on June 12, 2009. Because WXEL-TV continued to use its former analog channel number 42 as a virtual channel, WHDT was assigned 9 as its new virtual channel. WHDT is assigned to RF channel 34 in the repacked UHF TV band following conclusion of the Incentive Spectrum Auction in early 2017.

Former translator
Until 2019, the station's programming was simulcast on translator station WHDN-CD (channel 9) in Naples, Florida.

See also
 WHDT-LD (former partner station in Boston)

References

External links 

Television channels and stations established in 2000
HDT
E. W. Scripps Company television stations
2000 establishments in Florida
Independent television stations in the United States
Court TV affiliates
TrueReal affiliates
Stuart, Florida